The 21st General Assembly of Prince Edward Island represented the colony of Prince Edward Island between April 12, 1859, and 1863. An elected assembly had been dissolved by the governor earlier in 1859 because it could not choose a speaker.

The Assembly sat at the pleasure of the Governor of Prince Edward Island, Dominick Daly. Donald Montgomery was elected speaker.

Edward Palmer was Premier.

Members

The members of the Prince Edward Island Legislature after the general election of 1859 were:

Note that the losing candidate for Georgetown and Royalty, Roderick MacAulay, petitioned the Prince Edward Island House of Assembly to complain about an undue election.  Specifically, Roderick MacAulay claimed that a number of people had voted in the Georgetown / Georgetown Royalty electoral district who were not entitled to vote.  As a result, the colonial government held a review of the eligibility of some of the voters.  This review took place at the Georgetown courthouse starting on March 25, 1859.  As a result of this review, Roderick MacAulay was declared elected by the House of Assembly in place of Andrew A. MacDonald on April 27, 1859. Roderick MacAulay took his seat in the House of Assembly the following day.

External links 
 Journal of the House of Assembly of Prince Edward Island (1859)

Terms of the General Assembly of Prince Edward Island
1859 establishments in Prince Edward Island
1863 disestablishments in Prince Edward Island